Sidh is a village located in Tehsil Kharian, in the Gujrat District of Pakistan.

Location
Its neighbouring villages include Kohli, Jakharr, Bhaati and Udha.
By election area It has UC-102, PP-33, NA-71.

Demographics
The majority of inhabitants of village are Sidhu Jatts; the name of the village is derived from their caste. Sidhus are martial race and they come from elite clan of warriors and were sought after soldiers in the history of sub-continent and subsequently during the British raj owing to their bravery and being expert in the skill of warfare. Total of 500 homes are situated in Sidh, of which more than 400 are
Jatts. Katy's tends to use surname Chauhdhary. Others castes are Bhatti, Baig, Tarkhan, Darzi, Lohar & Syed.

Economy
Sidh hosts five Mosques, a post office, an animal hospital, shops, a mill and many schools. The land surrounding the village is arid, production of crops is totally dependent on seasonal rainfall. As a result, agriculture has not been the main source of income for the local population. Many of the villagers have gone overseas to find work.
Some people have settled in England, USA, Germany, UAE, Saudi Arabia, France, Italy and Greece etc.

Sports
Sidh is also a very popular village amongst all the villages of Gujrat for its sports. Basic sports played in Sidh are Cricket, Football, Volleyball, Badminton and Kabaddi. Sidhu fighters Cricket Club is currently the most successful team of the village. It has recently won about 15 tournament in a very short time period of 16 months and they have not stopped yet. Sidh has produced many great players of the region in many sports.

Schools
 Government High School for Girls
 Government Elementary School for Boys
 Government Primary School for Girls
 Government Primary School for Boys
 Hassan Public High School
 The Village Public School
 Quaid-e-Azam Public High School

Religious schools

Dar ul Uloom Muhammadia Ghosia Al-Karam Town Sidh.

Facilities
Shops & Plazas, Bakery, Swimming Pool, Fertile Land, Schools, Poultry Farm, Post Office, Local Transport, Paved Streets, Graveyard, PTCL Landline, Vfone, DSL Internet, Telephone Exchange, Cable TV, Electricity, Animal Hospital, Religious Schools, Wide Play-Grounds, Water Filter Plants and Welfare Foundation.

References

Website
Sidhnews.com is an official website of Sidh,Gujrat,Pakistan
All Rights Reserved © Copyrights - 2015 - 2018

Populated places in Gujrat District